Patrick Monahan (born 23 June 1976) is an Irish-Iranian comedian, who won the television competition series Take the Mike in 2001 and Show Me the Funny in 2011. He has performed regularly at the Edinburgh Festival Fringe.

Monahan also holds the world record for "Longest Hug" at a time of 25 hours and 25 minutes, alongside fellow comedian Bob Slayer. They set this record at Edinburgh Fringe Festival 2013.

Background

Monahan's father was an Irish welder, who met Monahan's mother in a bank in Ahvaz, Iran prior to the Iranian Revolution, where Monhen was born. 
When he was 3 he and his parents and siblings had to leave the country during the '79 revolution, in company with his brother and sister, the three-year-old Monahan had to pose as his grandparents' son, because only one boy per couple could leave the country.

Monahan has two passports – one Iranian and one Irish one, using his Irish passport for travelling.

Career

Live performances
Monahan is a comedy festival regular and has performed solo shows in a number of cities including Edinburgh, Glasgow and Manchester, and also at most major venues throughout the UK. He has also performed across the globe in countries including Dubai, Luxembourg and Germany.

He has done shows which refer to the occasional racism he encountered growing up in Middlesbrough.

During the Edinburgh Festival Fringe he has performed at the Gilded Balloon, including in August 2015 with his show The Disco Years. Also at the 2015 Edinburgh Fringe, he debuted a play which he wrote and in which he also performed.

Monahan's humour relies heavily on audience interaction and an animated story-telling style that draws on his own experiences. He is known within comedy circles to "ignore the light", meaning he will eat into other comic's time or cause overall delays to the program.

Television
In August 2011, Monahan won the ITV stand-up comedy contest Show Me the Funny. Shortly after winning, he performed on The Comedy Annual, a one-off programme celebrating the year in comedy.

On 10 March 2012, he participated in the BBC One programme Let's Dance for Sport Relief. He danced to "Only Girl (In the World)" by Rihanna, but was eliminated by the public vote and did not go on to perform in the final the following week.

In January 2014, Monahan participated in the second series of the ITV celebrity diving show Splash!. His first appearance on the show was in the third heat, which aired live on 18 January 2014. Despite coming 2nd out of 5 contestants, he was the first celebrity diver to be eliminated in Heat 3. Also was the only celebrity to dive from the 10 metres board in his heat.

Stand-Up DVDs
Patrick Monahan Live was his Show Me The Funny winner's DVD. It was released on 28 November 2011 by 2 Entertain and produced by Big Talk Productions.

Other work

Monahan became a patron of Zoe's Place Baby Hospice in Middlesbrough, after active fundraising for the charity. Monahan runs the London Marathon, Great North Run and Middlesbrough 10K annually in aid of Zöe's Place Baby Hospice, of which he is now a patron. On 15 March 2013, Monahan visited Stokesley School where he helped raise over £1,000 for Comic Relief. He did this by getting the entire school to do the Harlem shake. 

In 2016, Monahan along with numerous other celebrities, toured the UK to support Jeremy Corbyn's bid to become Prime Minister.

References

External links 
 https://www.facebook.com/patrickjmonahan
 https://twitter.com/PatrickJMonahan

1976 births
20th-century Irish comedians
21st-century Irish comedians
Living people
Iranian comedians
Irish male comedians
Irish people of Iranian descent
Iranian people of Irish descent
Labour Party (UK) people
People from Ahvaz